Amir Bilali (born 15 April 1994) is a Macedonian-born Albanian professional footballer who plays as a centre back for Montenegrin club Sutjeska Nikšić.

Honours
Celje
Slovenian Cup: runner-up 2014–15

Notes

References

External links

 

1994 births
People from Gostivar
Albanians in North Macedonia
Living people
Albanian footballers
Albania youth international footballers
Albanian footballers from North Macedonia
Association football defenders
NK Celje players
KF Bylis Ballsh players
FK Rabotnički players
KF Teuta Durrës players
FK Shkupi players
FK Partizani Tirana players
LPS HD Clinceni players
Mezőkövesdi SE footballers
FC Akzhayik players
FK Sutjeska Nikšić players
Slovenian PrvaLiga players
Kategoria Superiore players
Macedonian First Football League players
Liga I players
Nemzeti Bajnokság I players
Kazakhstan Premier League players
Montenegrin First League players
Albanian expatriate footballers
Expatriate footballers in Italy
Albanian expatriate sportspeople in Italy
Expatriate footballers in Slovenia
Albanian expatriate sportspeople in Slovenia
Expatriate footballers in North Macedonia
Albanian expatriate sportspeople in North Macedonia
Expatriate footballers in Romania
Albanian expatriate sportspeople in Romania
Expatriate footballers in Hungary
Albanian expatriate sportspeople in Hungary
Expatriate footballers in Kazakhstan
Albanian expatriate sportspeople in Kazakhstan
Expatriate footballers in Montenegro
Albanian expatriate sportspeople in Montenegro